Addictive Hip Hop Muzick is the debut studio album by American recording artist Kokane, and the only one released under his 'Who Am I?' alias. It was released on July 2, 1991 through Ruthless Records and Epic Records. Recording sessions took place at the Edge Recording Studio in Inglewood, California. Production was handled by Cold 187um and fellow Above the Law members with executive production by Lay Law and Eazy-E. It was mixed by Dr. Dre and Cold 187um at Audio Achievements in Torrance, California. The album features contributions from DJ Total K-oss, Funkette, Go Mack, KM.G, Lay Law, Lillian, Mz Kilo and Tha New Funkateers on vocals, Cold 187 um on vocals and keyboards, Stan "The Guitar Man" Jones on bass and guitar.

Track listing

Sample credits
"Would U Die 4 Me" sampled "After the Dance (Instrumental)" by Marvin Gaye (1976)
"Action" sampled "Mission: Impossible Theme" by Lalo Schifrin (1967), "Funky Drummer" by James Brown (1970), "Feel Good" by Fancy (1974) and "No More ?'s" by Eazy-E (1988)
"Inner City Hoodlum" sampled "Flow On" by Above the Law (1990)
"Nickel Slick Nigga" sampled "Impeach the President" by The Honey Drippers (1973)
"Meditation" sampled "Gangster Boogie" by Chicago Gangsters (1975) and "N.T." by Kool & the Gang (1971)
"Dope Sound Boy" sampled "Back to Life (Acapella)" by Soul II Soul (1989) and "105 BPM Dopejam" by Simon Harris (1989)
"Keep The Flavor" sampled "The Champ" by The Mohawks (1968), "Jungle Boogie" by Kool & the Gang (1973) and "Dazz" by Brick (1976)
"Brain On Kane" sampled "Illegal Business" by Boogie Down Productions (1988), "Sa Prize (Part 2)" by N.W.A (1990) and "Sing a Simple Song" by Sly & the Family Stone (1968)
"Pure Kane Nigga" sampled "Kool Is Back" by Funk, Inc. (1971) and "Cramp Your Style" by All the People & Robert Moore (1972)
"B.O.P. (Big Old Pimp)" sampled "Freddie's Dead" by Curtis Mayfield (1972)
"Pimp Mentality" sampled "Gangsta Gangsta" by N.W.A (1988)
"Cocaine Business" sampled "Ironside" by Quincy Jones (1971), "Funky President (People It's Bad)" by James Brown (1974), ""T" Plays It Cool" by Marvin Gaye (1972) and "UFO" by ESG (1981)
"U.S.C.'s Finest" sampled "Ashley's Roachclip" by The Soul Searchers (1974) and "Gangsta Gangsta" by N.W.A (1988)

Personnel
Jerry Buddy Long, Jr. – lead vocals
Gregory Fernan Hutchinson – vocals, keyboards, producer, mixing
Larry Goodman – vocals, co-producer, executive producer
Kevin Michael Gulley – vocals, co-producer
Anthony Stewart – vocals, co-producer
Arthur Lee Goodman III – vocals, co-producer
Rachelle Thomas – vocals
David Dyson – additional vocals
Stan "The Guitar Man" Jones – bass, guitar
Mark "The Don" Paladino – engineering
Donovan Smith – engineering
Andre Young – mixing
Eric Wright – executive producer

References

External links

Kokane albums
1991 debut albums
Ruthless Records albums
Albums produced by Laylaw
Albums produced by Cold 187um